Anything Goes! The Dave Brubeck Quartet Plays Cole Porter is a 1967 studio album by Dave Brubeck and his quartet of music by Cole Porter, recorded between December 8, 1965 and February 17, 1966.

Reception

The initial Billboard magazine review from February 18, 1967 commented that "Cole Porter's songs easily fit into the jazz treatment offered by the Dave Brubeck Quartet...The album has a pop potential, too".

The album was reviewed by Scott Yanow at Allmusic who wrote that the musicians "Few surprises occur but the music often swings hard, pianist Brubeck and altoist Paul Desmond take several excellent solos and bassist Eugene Wright and drummer Joe Morello really push the group."

Track listing
 "Anything Goes" – 5:40
 "Love for Sale" – 5:18
 "Night and Day" – 4:55
 "What Is This Thing Called Love?" – 6:16
 "I Get a Kick Out of You" – 5:15
 "Just One of Those Things" – 6:19
 "You're the Top" – 6:35
 "All Through the Night" – 8:25

All compositions by Cole Porter

Personnel
Dave Brubeck – piano
Paul Desmond – alto saxophone
Gene Wright – double bass
Joe Morello – drums
Teo Macero – producer

References

1967 albums
Albums produced by Teo Macero
Cole Porter tribute albums
Columbia Records albums
Dave Brubeck albums